Donatus Ó Gallchobhair (died 1581) was a Roman Catholic prelate who served as Bishop of Down and Connor (1580–1581) and Bishop of Killala (1570–1580).

Biography
Ó Gallchobhair was ordained a priest in the Order of Friars Minor. On 4 September 1570, he was appointed during the papacy of Pope Pius V as Bishop of Killala. On 5 November 1570, he was consecrated bishop by Thomas Goldwell, Bishop of Saint Asaph, with William Chisholm, Bishop Emeritus of Dunblane, and Giuseppe Pamphilj, Bishop of Segni serving as co-consecrators. On 23 March 1580, Ó Gallchobhair was appointed during the papacy of Pope Gregory XIII as Bishop of Down and Connor. He served as Bishop of Down and Connor until his death in 1581.

References 

16th-century Roman Catholic bishops in Ireland
Bishops appointed by Pope Pius V
Bishops appointed by Pope Gregory XIII
1581 deaths
Year of birth missing
People from County Mayo